Gottfried Schär (3 June 1936 – 26 May 2021) was a Swiss rower. He competed in the men's eight event at the 1960 Summer Olympics.

References

1936 births
2021 deaths
Swiss male rowers
Olympic rowers of Switzerland
Rowers at the 1960 Summer Olympics
Sportspeople from Lucerne